The SIAI S.67 or Savoia Marchetti SM.67 was an Italian flying boat fighter of the early 1930s designed and manufactured by SIAI.

Design and development
In 1929, the Regia Marina (Italian Royal Navy) awarded a contract to SIAI to produce the prototype of a new flying boat fighter for use as a catapult-launched aircraft aboard Condottieri-class cruisers. In response, SIAI designed the S.67, a wooden, single-seat, monoplane flying boat powered by a 313-kilowatt (420-horsepower) Fiat A.20 V12 liquid-cooled engine driving a three-bladed pusher propeller. The wing spars were attached to the fuselage, and the engine was mounted on steel tube struts above the hull, each attached to the engine mount by one pin. The S.67s armament consisted of two fixed, forward-firing 7.7-millimeter (0.303-inch) Vickers machine guns mounted in the bow. The S.67s design allowed a team of six men aboard a cruiser to erect it on its catapult and have it ready for launch within five minutes.

Operational history
The S.67 made its first flight on 28 January 1930. Il Centro Sperimentali (The Experimental Center) began testing of the prototype in early March 1930, during which it crashed on 3 April 1930.

Despite this unfortunate end to the testing program, SIAI received a production order for three more aircraft. One of these was cancelled, but the other two entered service with the 162ª Squadriglia (162nd Squadron) of the 88° Gruppo Caccia Marittima (88th Maritime Fighter Group). They were retired in 1935.

Operators

Regia Marina (Italian Royal Navy)
162ª Squadriglia, 88° Gruppo Caccia Marittima

Specifications

Notes:
Time to 3,000 m (9,842 ft): 9.78 min

See also

Notes

References

Green, William, and Gordon Swanborough. The Complete Book of Fighters: An Illustrated Encyclopedia of Every Fighter Aircraft Built and Flown. New York: SMITHMARK Publishers, 1994. .

S.67
1930s Italian fighter aircraft
Single-engined pusher aircraft
High-wing aircraft
Aircraft first flown in 1930